Robert Evans (16 July 1927 – 1 September 2001) was a Scottish football player and manager, most notable for his time with Celtic.

Career

Evans began playing football for Glasgow Junior side Pollok. He then joined Celtic during 1944 from another Glasgow junior side St. Anthony's. He started out as a forward, but it was not until manager Jimmy McGrory moved him back to right half that Evans became a Celtic great.

Celtic's long-awaited Scottish Cup victory of 1951 and the historic Saint Mungo Cup win of the same summer gave Evans his first taste of major success. He then went on to give the sustained performance of a lifetime throughout the unexpectedly triumphant Coronation Cup run two years later. In the final, Evans played the great Lawrie Reilly out of the game and instigated the move that led to Jimmy Walsh's clinching strike in the 2–0 defeat of favourites Hibernian.

Evans was the first Celtic captain to lift the Scottish League Cup in 1956 and he famously helped defend it a year later against Rangers in the final that became known as Hampden in the Sun. He made 535 appearances for Celtic and scored 10 goals in 16 years with the club. During this time he won 48 caps for Scotland. Evans also won 25 caps for the Scottish League XI, the most of any player.

Evans left Celtic in 1960, heading south to Chelsea, where he played for one season before being appointed player-manager of Newport County. He returned to Scotland in a playing capacity with Greenock Morton in 1962, then joined Third Lanark as a player with coaching duties in 1963. He was promoted to manager in June 1964 but left after a difficult 1964–65 season. He played with Raith Rovers for two further years. He played for them as they won promotion from Division Two to Division One in 1967 before retiring at the end of that year, at the age of 39.

Evans died of pneumonia in 2001, after suffering for several years with dementia and Parkinson's disease. In 2008 he was posthumously inducted to the Scottish Football Hall of Fame.

Career statistics

International appearances

Honours 
 Celtic
Scottish Division A: 1953–54
Scottish Cup: 1950–51, 1953–54
Scottish League Cup: 1956–57, 1957–58
Saint Mungo Cup: 1951–52
Coronation Cup: 1953
Glasgow Cup: 1948–49, 1955–56
Glasgow Charity Cup: 1949–50, 1952–53, 1958–59
Victory in Europe Cup: 1945

 Scotland
British Home Championship: 1948–49, 1955–56, 1959–60

 Individual
Rex Kingsley Footballer of the Year: 1953

See also
 List of footballers in Scotland by number of league appearances (500+)
 List of Scotland national football team captains

References

External links 
 
 The Celtic story of Bobby Evans, Celtic F.C.

1927 births
2001 deaths
Scottish footballers
Association football defenders
Association football wing halves
English Football League players
Celtic F.C. players
Chelsea F.C. players
Newport County A.F.C. players
Greenock Morton F.C. players
Third Lanark A.C. players
Raith Rovers F.C. players
Scotland international footballers
1954 FIFA World Cup players
1958 FIFA World Cup players
Scottish football managers
Newport County A.F.C. managers
Third Lanark A.C. managers
Deaths from pneumonia in Scotland
Scottish Football Hall of Fame inductees
Scottish Football League players
Scottish Football League representative players
St Anthony's F.C. players
Pollok F.C. players
Scottish Junior Football Association players
Scottish Football League managers